Bifurcation memory is a generalized name for some specific features of the behaviour of the dynamical system near the bifurcation.

General information 

The phenomenon is known also under the names of "stability loss delay for dynamical bifurcations" and "ghost attractor".

The essence of the effect of bifurcation memory lies in the appearance of a special type of transition process. An ordinary transition process is characterized by asymptotic approach of the dynamical system from the state defined by its initial conditions to the state corresponding to its stable stationary regime in the basin of attraction of which the system found itself. However, near the bifurcation boundary can be observed two types of transition processes: passing through the place of the vanished stationary regime, the dynamic system  slows down its asymptotic motion temporarily, "as if recollecting the defunct orbit", with the number of revolutions of the phase trajectory in this area of bifurcation memory depending on proximity of the corresponding parameter of the system to its bifurcation value, — and only then  the phase trajectory rushes to the state that corresponds to stable stationary regime of the system.

In the literature, the effect of bifurcation memory is associated with a dangerous "bifurcation of merging".

The twice repeated bifurcation memory effects in dynamical systems were also described in literature; they were observed, when parameters of the dynamical system under consideration were chosen in the area of either  crossing  two different bifurcation boundaries, or their close neighbourhood.

The known definitions 

It is claimed that the term "bifurcation memory":

History of studying 

A new wave of interest in the study of the strange behaviour of dynamic systems in a certain region of the state space has been caused by the desire to explain the non-linear effects revealed during the getting out of controllability of ships.

Subsequently, similar phenomena were also found in biological systems — in the system of blood coagulation and in one of the mathematical models of myocardium.

Topicality 

The topicality of scientific studies of the bifurcation memory is obviously driven by the desire to prevent conditions of reduced controllability of the vehicle.

In addition, the special sort of tachycardias connected with the effects of bifurcation memory are considered in cardiophysics.

See also 

 Bifurcation (disambiguation)
 Bifurcation diagram
 Bifurcation theory
 Phase portrait

Notes

References 
 Books

 Papers

Biophysics
Nonlinear systems
Dynamical systems
Non-equilibrium thermodynamics